The Abbott 33 is a Canadian sailboat, that was designed by Jan Torben Larsen and Abbott Boats and first built in 1981.

The Abbott 33 is a development of Larsen's SCAN-KAP 99 design, which was built in Denmark.

Production
The boat was built by Abbott Boats in Sarnia, Ontario, Canada. The company built 40 examples starting in 1981, but it is now out of production.

Design

The Abbott 33 is a small recreational keelboat, built predominantly of fibreglass. It has a fractional sloop rig, an internally-mounted spade-type rudder and a fixed fin keel. It displaces  and carries  of ballast.

The boat has a PHRF racing average handicap of 126 with a high of 132 and low of 120.

See also
List of sailing boat types

Similar sailboats
Alajuela 33
Arco 33
C&C 3/4 Ton
C&C 33
C&C 101
C&C SR 33
Cape Dory 33
Cape Dory 330
CS 33
Endeavour 33
Hans Christian 33
Hunter 33
Hunter 33-2004
Hunter 33.5
Hunter 333
Hunter 336
Hunter 340
Marlow-Hunter 33
Mirage 33
Moorings 335
Nonsuch 33
Tanzer 10
Viking 33
Watkins 33

References

External links

Keelboats
1980s sailboat type designs
Sailing yachts
Sailboat type designs by Jan Torben Larsen
Sailboat types built by Abbott Boats